The Eshrefids or Ashrafids (Modern Turkish: Eşrefoğulları or Eşrefoğulları Beyliği ) was one of the Anatolian beyliks.

Capital
Its capital was in Beyşehir.

Foundation
It was one of the frontier principalities established by Oghuz Turkish clans after the decline of Sultanate of Rum.

End of dynasty
The dynasty ended when Mubariz al-Din Mehmed was executed by Timurtash.

List of rulers
 Sulayman ibn Eshref Bey (1280-1302)
 Mubariz al-Din Mehmed Bey (1302-1320)
 Sulayman II Bey (1320–26)

See also
Eşrefoğlu Mosque

Literature 
 Claude Cahen: Pre-Ottoman Turkey, 1969

References

Anatolian beyliks
History of Konya Province
States and territories established in the 1280s